Edward Long may refer to:

Edward Long (1734–1813), British colonial administrator and historian
Edward Henry Carroll Long (1808–1865), US Representative from Maryland
Edward V. Long (1908–1972), US Senator from Missouri

See also
Ed Long (disambiguation)
Eddie Long (disambiguation)

Ted Long (disambiguation)